Walter Göttsch (1896-1918) was a German First World War fighter ace credited with 20 confirmed aerial victories.

The victory list

Walter Göttsch's victories are reported in chronological order, not the order or dates the victories were confirmed by headquarters.
Background information from Above the Lines and The Aerodrome website. Supplemental information cited in individual victories and claims. Abbreviations were expanded by the editor creating this list.

Footnotes

Citations

Sources
 
 Guttman, Jon. Balloon-Busting Aces of World War 1 . Osprey Publishing, 2005. , 
 

Göttsch, Walter
Aerial victories of Göttsch, Walter